Nordisk Frøkontor (lit. "Nordic Seed Office") was a Danish wholesaler of seeds founded in 1879 at Havnegade in the Gammelholm neighbourhood of central Copenhagen, Denmark. Its former headquarters at Havnegade 39, a listed warehouse which predates it with 10 years, has been converted into serviced offices.

History
The warehouse at No. 39 was built in 1869 to design by J. Kern. It was originally used for the storage of ship paint. It was built as part of the redevelopment of the former Gammelholm naval dockyards.

The company Nordisk Frøkontor was founded by Ludvig Søren Lyngbye in 1879. In 1891, Boldt Andreas Jørgensen  became a partner in the company and the Lyngbye left it the following year. Boldt Andreas  owned it until 1917 when it was converted into an aktieselskab In 1950, I. Leser Pedersen was CRO of the company while Supreme Court aturney  Hans Madsen  was chairman of the board.

Olsen & Ahlmann was based in the building in 1919.

Building

Nordisk Frøkontor's name is still seen on the facade of the building. A passageway next to the building opens to a yard and a former warehouse on its rear.

Today
The building is now owned by Brink Serviced Offices and is operated as serviced offices under the name Business Center Havnegade .

References

External links

 Official website
 PDF about the building
 Video presentation of Business Center Havnegade (in Danish)

Listed buildings and structures in Copenhagen
Warehouses in Copenhagen
Buildings and structures completed in 1869
Gammelholm
Wholesalers of Denmark
Danish companies established in 1879